Nicosia District (Greek: Eπαρχία Λευκωσίας) is one of the six districts of Cyprus. Its main town is the island country's capital city, Nicosia. The TRNC-controlled northern part of the district is the Lefkoşa District of the unrecognized Turkish Republic of Northern Cyprus.

TRNC-controlled areas of the Larnaca District of the Republic of Cyprus are administered as part of Nicosia District, while western parts of the Nicosia District under de facto TRNC control are administered as part of the new Güzelyurt and Lefke Districts.

History
Under Lusignan rule, at least the latter part and then during the Venetian period, the Kingdom of Cyprus was divided into eleven provinces called in French contrées and in Italian contrade. The area around Nicosia was the province of Vicomté (literally the domain of a Viscount). It covered the eastern half of the present District of Nicosia, what would later become the Nahiehs of Dagh and Deyirmenlik (orange on map). The western half of the present district formed the province of Pendaïa (Pendagia). One significant difference in the borders was that Vicomté extended closer to the sea, encroaching upon the Pentadaktylos foothills in the present Kyrenia District.

Under Ottoman Turkish rule, Nicosia was one of the six cazas into which the island was divided. The Caza of Nicosia, also known as the Caza of Deyirmenlik,  was divided into two nahiehs - Dagh (Orini) and Deyirmenlik (Kythrea). The caza was headed by a Kaimakan. When the British took control of Cyprus in 1878, these administrative units were retained. A British officer styled a Commissioner (later District Officer) was appointed for the caza of Nicosia, while the Turkish Kaimakan was initially retained with certain of his functions.

The Nahiehs of Lefka and Morphou
were previously in the Caza of Kyrenia. But by 1881, the 
Nahiehs of the Caza of Nicosia were:
 Lefka
 Morphou
 Dagh
 Deyirmenlik
The town of Nicosia, previously separate, came under the Nahieh of Deyirmenlik (Greek: Kythrea) in the British period.

Population

The population of Nicosia Caza or District in 1881 was as follows:
 

At the most recent census the population of the district was as follows:

The total figure above includes 1,599 for the communities of Melouseia, Tremetousia and Arsos in Larnaca District and Afania in Famagusta District.

Thus, the population of Nicosia District has increased eight-fold since 1881.

Settlements
According to Statistical Codes of Municipalities, Communities and Quarters of Cyprus per the Statistical Service of Cyprus (2015), Nicosia District has 12 municipalities and 162 communities. Municipalities are written with bold.

 Agia
 Agia Eirini
 Agia Marina
 Agia Marina (Skylloura)
 Agia Varvara
 Agioi Iliofotoi
 Agioi Trimithias
 Agios Dometios
 Agios Epifanios Oreinis
 Agios Epifanios Soleas
 Agios Georgios
 Agios Georgios Lefkas
 Agios Ioannis (Selemani)
 Agios Ioannis Malountas
 Agios Nikolaos Lefkas
 Agios Sozomenos
 Agios Theodoros, Nicosia
 Agios Theodoros Tilliria
 Agios Vasileios
 Aglandjia
 Agrokipia
 Akaki
 Alampra
 Alevga
 Alithinou
 Alona
 Ammadies
 Ampelikou
 Analiontas
 Anageia
 Angolemi
 Anthoupolis
 Apliki
 Arediou
 Argaki
 Askas
 Astromeritis
 Avlona
 Beykeuy 
 Dali
 Deneia
 Dyo Potamoi
 Elia
 Engomi
 Epicho
 Episkopeio
 Ergates
 Evrychou
 Exometochi
 Farmakas
 Fikardou
 Flasou
 Fterikoudi
 Fyllia
 Galata
 Galini
 Gerakies
 Geri
 Gerolakkos
 Gönyeli
 Gourri
 Kakopetria
 Kaliana
 Kalo Chorio Kapouti
 Kalo Chorio Oreinis 
 Kalo Chorio Soleas
 Kalopanagiotis
 Kalyvakia
 Kampi
 Kampia
 Kampos
 Kanli
 Kannavia
 Kapedes
 Karavostasi
 Kataliontas
 Kato Deftera
 Katokopia
 Kato Koutrafas
 Kato Moni
 Kato Pyrgos
 Kato Zodeia
 Katydata
 Kazivera
 Klirou
 Kokkina
 Kokkinotrimithia
 Korakou
 Kotsiatis
 Kourou Monastiri
 Kyra
 Kythrea
 Lagoudera
 Lakatamia
 Latsia
 Lazanias
 Lefka
 Linou
 Livadia
 Louroujina
 Loutros
 Lympia
 Lythrodontas
 Malounta
 Mammari
 Mandres
 Mansoura
 Margi
 Margo
 Masari
 Mathiatis
 Meniko
 Mia Milia
 Mylikouri
 Mitsero
 Mora
 Morphou
 Mosfileri
 Moutoullas
 Neo Chorio
 Nicosia
 Nikitari
 Nikitas
 Nisou
 Oikos
 Orounta
 Ortaköy
 Pachyammos
 Palaichori Morphou
 Palaichori Oreinis
 Palaikythro
 Paliometocho
 Pano Deftera
 Pano Koutrafas
 Pano Pyrgos
 Pano Zodeia
 Pedoulas
 Pentageia
 Pera
 Pera Chorio
 Peristerona
 Peristeronari
 Petra
 Petra tou Digeni
 Pigenia
 Platanistasa
 Politiko
 Polystypos
 Potami
 Potamia
 Prastio
 Psimolofou
 Pyrogi
 Saranti
 Selladi tou Appi
 Sia
 Sinaoros
 Skouriotissa
 Skylloura
 Spilia
 Strovolos
 Syrianochori
 Temvria
 Trachoni
 Trachonas
 Tsakistra
 Tseri
 Tymbou
 Variseia
 Voni
 Vroisha
 Vyzakia
 Xerovounos
 Xyliatos

References

 
Districts of Cyprus